T Coronae Borealis (T CrB), is a recurring nova in the constellation Corona Borealis. It was first discovered in outburst in 1866 by John Birmingham, although it had been observed earlier as a 10th magnitude star.

Description

T CrB normally has a magnitude of about 10, which is near the limit of typical binoculars. It has been seen to outburst twice, reaching magnitude 2.0 on May 12, 1866 and magnitude 3.0 on February 9, 1946, although a more recent paper shows the 1866 outburst with a possible peak range of magnitude 2.5 ± 0.5.  Even when at peak magnitude of 2.5, this recurrent nova is dimmer than about 120 stars in the night sky. It is sometimes nicknamed the Blaze Star.

T CrB is a binary system containing a large cool component and a smaller hot component.  The cool component is a red giant which is transferring material to the hot component.  The hot component is a white dwarf surrounded by an accretion disc, all hidden inside a dense cloud of material from the red giant.  When the system is quiescent, the red giant dominates the visible light output and the system appears as an M3 giant.  The hot component contributes some emission and dominates the ultraviolet output.  During outbursts, the transfer of material to the hot component increases greatly, the hot component expands, and the luminosity of the system increases. 

The two components of the system orbit each other every 228 days. The orbit is almost circular and is inclined at an angle of 67°.

2016-present activity
On 20 April 2016, the Sky and Telescope website reported a sustained brightening since February 2015 from magnitude 10.5 to about 9.2. A similar event was reported in 1938, shortly before the 1946 outburst. By June 2018, the star had dimmed slightly but still remained at an unusually high level of activity. Since then, according to observations sent to the AAVSO, the star has hovered around magnitude 10.0.

References

Further reading

 R and T Coronae Borealis: Two Stellar Opposites  at Sky & Telescope

External links
 http://www.daviddarling.info/encyclopedia/B/Blaze_Star.html
 AAVSO: Quick Look View of AAVSO Observations (get recent magnitude estimates for T CrB)

Recurrent novae
Corona Borealis
143454
Coronae Borealis, T
M-type giants
18660512
BD+26 2765
J15593015+2555126
White dwarfs
078322
Astronomical events in the near future